Abad-e Chehel Tan (also Romanized as  Ābād-e Chehel Tan and Ābād Chehel Tan; also known as Āb Bād-e Chehel Tan) is a village in Rud Ab-e Gharbi Rural District, Rud Ab District, Narmashir County, Kerman Province, Iran. At the 2006 census, its population was 213, in 51 families.

References 

Populated places in Narmashir County